The Ecuadorian piculet (Picumnus sclateri) is a species of bird in subfamily Picumninae of the woodpecker family Picidae. It is found in Ecuador and Peru.

Taxonomy and systematics

The Ecuadorian piculet has three subspecies, the nominate P. s. sclateri (Taczanowski, 1877), P. s. parvistriatus (Chapman, 1921), and P. s. porcullae (Bond, J, 1954). P. s. parvistriatus was originally described as a separate species.

Description

Adult males of the nominate subspecies have a black cap with tiny yellow spots on the forehead and tiny white ones on the rest of it. Their upperparts are gray-brown with obscure darker bars. The upper side of their tail is blackish; the innermost pair of feathers have mostly white inner webs and the outer three pairs have a white area near the tip. Their underparts are whitish with black or dusky barring on the breast and flanks and black streaks on the belly. Adult females are identical but for whitish spots on their entire crown.

Subspecies P. s. parvistriatus has larger white spots on the crown than the nominate, and the bars and streaks on the underparts are much thinner. P. s. porcullae has pale beige streaking on the upperparts and its underparts have black barring and little to no streaking.

Distribution and habitat

Subspecies P. s. parvistriatus of the Ecuadorian piculet is the northernmost, and its range is separate from that of the other two. It is found in western Ecuador from Manabí Province to northern Guayas Province. P. s. sclateri is found from El Oro and Loja provinces in southwestern Ecuador south into extreme northwestern Peru. P. s. porcullae is found in northwestern Peru's departments of Piura and Lambayeque.

The Ecuadorian piculet primarily inhabits deciduous forest and arid scrublands, though in Loja it also occurs in more humid landscapes. In Peru it occurs up to  but mostly is below .

Behavior

Feeding

The Ecuadorian piculet's diet is mostly very small insects but is not known in detail. It actively forages on thin branches, picking and tapping.

Social behavior

The Ecuadorian piculet is usually seen singly, in pairs, or in small groups that might be families. It often associates with loose flocks of other small passerines.

Breeding

The Ecuadorian piculet's breeding season in Ecuador is from July through September and in Peru from June to September. Nothing else is known about its breeding biology.

Vocalization

The Ecuadorian piculet is described as "rather quiet", but does have an apparent song that is "a slow, descending series of notes (generally 3, sometimes up to 7): swee swee swee". It also makes "a high-pitched tseee-tsut or tseeet" and "a quick, stuttering series...tititi-swee."

Status

The IUCN has assessed the Ecuadorian piculet as being of Least Concern. It has a restricted range, and though its population size is not known it is believed to be stable. No immediate threats have been identified. It is described as uncommon in both countries and "[h]uman activity has little short-term direct effect on [the] Ecuadorian Piculet, other than the local effects of habitat destruction."

References

Ecuadorian piculet
Birds of Ecuador
Ecuadorian piculet
Ecuadorian piculet
Taxonomy articles created by Polbot